John Simms may refer to:

John Simms (clergyman) (1854–1934), Northern Irish Presbyterian clergyman, British Army chaplain, and Unionist politician
Jack Simms (1903–?), English footballer
John F. Simms (1916–1975), American politician, Governor of New Mexico, 1955–1957

See also
John Sims (disambiguation)